Life is the sixth album by American-Italian hard rock band Hardline. It was released on April 26, 2019 and was produced by Italian multi-instrumentalist Alessandro Del Vecchio via Neapolitan label Frontiers Records with the single Page of Your Life.
This is the first album with Italian musicians Mario Percudani on guitar e Marco Di Salvia on drums  respectively instead of Josh Ramos and Francesco Jovino.

It was preceded by the release of the singles "Who Wants to Live Forever" (Queen cover) on February 24, 2019, and "Take a Chance" on March 7, 2019.

The first leg of tour dates on their 2019/2020 Life tour began in Italy at the Frontiers Rock Festival with Johnny Gioeli performing an acoustic set on the first night with original Hardline band drummer Deen Castronovo and the current lineup performing the following night. The band was touring throughout Europe and Germany but stopped because of coronavirus pandemic. These postponed dates will be rescheduled to 2021. The album received positive reviews.

Track listing

Personnel
Johnny Gioeli - lead vocals
Alessandro Del Vecchio - keyboards, backing vocals, producing, recording, mixing, mastering
Anna Portalupi - bass guitar
Mario Percudani - guitar, backing vocals
Marco Di Salvia - drums, backing vocals

Additional personnel
Serafino Perugino - executive producing
Andrea Seveso - studio assistant
Riccardo Bernardi - pictures
Stan-W Decker - artwork, layout

References

2019 albums
Frontiers Records albums